African Queen is a studio album by South African singer Makhadzi, released on September 3, 2021 by Open Mic. It features Mkomasan, Prince Benza, Mr Brown, DJ Dance Okashi, Vee Mampeezy, Jon Delinger, Kabza De Small, Lady Du, Cassper Nyovest, Mr Bow, and Mlindo the Vocalist.

African Queen was certified gold in South Africa.

Background 
Album's release date was announced via her Twitter account on August 16, 2021.

Commercial Performance 
The album was certified gold in South Africa.

Track listing

Release history

References 

2021 albums
Albums by South African artists